Zuzana Moravčíková (born 23 October 1980) is a Slovak retired ice hockey centre and former member of the Slovak national team. She has served as general manager of the Slovak women's national under-18 ice hockey team since 2021.

International career
Moravčíková was selected to represent Slovakia in the women's ice hockey tournament at the 2010 Winter Olympics in Vancouver, where she played in all five games, though she did not record a point. She also played in the 2010 Olympic qualification tournament campaign.

Moravčíková participated in eight IIHF Women's World Championship tournaments, across two divisions. She debuted with the Slovak national team at the 1999 Ice Hockey Women's World Championship Group B and went on to play in the 2001 Division I qualification tournament in 2000, the Division II tournaments in 2003, 2004, 2005, and 2007; and the Division I tournaments in 2008 and 2009.

Career statistics

International career

References

External links
 
 
 

1980 births
Living people
European Women's Hockey League players
Ice hockey executives
Ice hockey players at the 2010 Winter Olympics
Olympic ice hockey players of Slovakia
Sportspeople from Ružomberok
Slovak women's ice hockey forwards